This is a list of notable people associated with the University of Kentucky in the United States.

Notable alumni (non-sports)

Academia and research 

Albert Balows (1921–2006), clinical microbiologist and the president of the American Society for Microbiology
Irving Millman (1923–2012), virologist and microbiologist

Business

Entertainment

Government, law, and public policy 

Note: Individuals who belong in multiple sections appear in the first relevant section.

Governors

Members of the US Congress

US federal and state judges

Other US political and legal figures 

Karen Berg (born 1961), physician, professor, and member of the Kentucky State Senate
Whitney Westerfield, politician

Journalism and literature

Military

Miscellaneous

Sports alumni

Basketball

Notes
 For players who enrolled from 1954 through 1971, their actual playing career did not start until a year after they first attended. At that time, freshmen were ineligible to play at varsity level.

 Willie Cauley-Stein (born 1993), NBA basketball player
 Sacha Killeya-Jones (born 1998), American-British basketball player for Hapoel Gilboa Galil of the Israeli Basketball Premier League

Football

Baseball

Other

Simidele Adeagbo, Olympic athlete
J. Elliott Burch, horse trainer
Russ Cochran, golfer on the PGA Champions Tour
Michael D'Agostino, soccer midfielder
Steve Flesch, golfer on the PGA Tour
Larry Glover, sports radio announcer
Andy Gruenebaum (born 1982), MLS goalkeeper
Jenny Hansen, 13-time All-American gymnast
J. B. Holmes, golfer on the PGA Tour
Kelli Hubly, NWSL defender 2017–present (currently with Portland Thorns FC)
Andy Jackson, former tennis coach for Mississippi State and the University of Florida
Josh Mulvany, English soccer midfielder
Chase Parker, golfer
Barry Rice, soccer defender
Mary Tucker, Olympic sports shooter, world champion in 10 meter air rifle

Notable faculty

References

University of Kentucky alumni